Bhrashtu is a 1978 Indian Malayalam film, directed by Thriprayar Sukumaran and produced by T. K. Baburajan. The film stars Sukumaran, Kuthiravattam Pappu, M. S. Namboothiri and Paravoor Bharathan in the lead roles. The film has musical score by M. S. Baburaj.

Cast
Sukumaran 
Kuthiravattam Pappu 
M. S. Namboothiri
Paravoor Bharathan 
Ravi Menon 
Reena 
Sreekala
Sujatha
Gemini Ganesan

Soundtrack
The music was composed by M. S. Baburaj and the lyrics were written by Naattika Sivaram.

References

External links
 

1978 films
1970s Malayalam-language films